Azad Kashmir is a dependent territory of Pakistan. It has 10 first-order administrative divisions called "districts," and each district is divided into tehsils. Geographically, the northern districts of Azad Kashmir encompass the lower part of the Himalayas. The southern districts of Azad Kashmir, which consist of the Bhimber, Kotli, and Mirpur districts have extremely hot weather in the summer and moderately cold weather in the winter.  Azad Kashmir receives rainfall in both the winter and summer seasons, with Muzaffarabad being among the wettest areas of Azad Kashmir.  The culture in the northern districts is similar to that of the people of Gilgit-Baltistan, where Balti and other languages are spoken.  In the central districts like Poonch, etc., the Hindko and Gojri languages are spoken, and in the southern districts, the culture of the people is similar to that of the Potoharis.

List of Districts

See also
 List of tehsils of Azad Kashmir

References

 
Azad Kashmir
||Haveli :Districts of Pakistan||